Aleksei Valeryevich Nikolaev (born 1 August 1971 in Moscow) is a former Russian football referee. He has been a FIFA international referee from 2007 to 2017. In 2011, he was selected for the FIFA U-17 World Cup in Mexico. Nikolaev has also officiated in 2010 World Cup qualifiers.

He works in the Russian Football Union refereeing committee since retiring as a referee.

References

External links
 
 

1971 births
Living people
Sportspeople from Moscow
Russian football referees